Shahid Muktijoddha Smriti Stadium is located by the Sherpur City Park, Sherpur, Bangladesh.

See also
Stadiums in Bangladesh
List of cricket grounds in Bangladesh

References

Cricket grounds in Bangladesh
Football venues in Bangladesh
Sherpur District